152 mm howitzer M1910/37 was a limited production Soviet 152.4 mm (6 inch) howitzer, a modernization of the 152 mm howitzer M1910, initially designed by Schneider. The gun was employed by Red Army in World War II.

Development and production history
The gun resulted from a modernization of the 152 mm howitzer M1910. The M1910 was initially designed by Schneider. Putilov Plant and Perm Plant delivered 348 pieces in 1911-27. By 1936, the RKKA possessed 101 M1910s, including 5 practice pieces.

Work on modernizing the gun started in 1936. Because of small number of M1910s in service, extensive upgrade was not considered worthwhile. The gun was rechambered for larger cartridge, same as used by the 152 mm howitzer M1909/30; upgraded barrels received a mark "lengthened chamber". Some pieces also had their wooden wheels replaced by steel ones with rubber tires, resulting in much higher transportation speed of 18 km/h. The modernized weapon was officially adopted as 152 mm howitzer model 1910/37.

By 1941, all M1910 howitzers were upgraded. There was no production of new pieces.

The design of M1910/37 was typical for World War I era howitzer. The gun had short (12 calibers) barrel with eccentric interrupted screw breechblock; hydraulic recoil buffer and pneumatic recuperator were both mounted under the barrel. The carriage was of single trail type with limited traverse and, typically, unsprung wooden wheels (some pieces received metal wheels with solid rubber tires). The gun was typically towed by a horse team (eight horses) by means of a limber. For each gun three horse-drawn ammunition boxes were issued; each box held 22 projectiles and 24 propellant charges.

Organization and employment

Under the organization of 1939, each rifle division had a howitzer regiment with a 152 mm howitzers battalion (12 pieces). In July 1941 these regiment were cancelled. Same fate befell 152 mm howitzers battalions of motorized and armored divisions.

Corps artillery units didn't employ 152 mm howitzers early in the war (they did use howitzer-guns ML-20); but from late 1943 the recreated corps artillery included a regiment consisted of five batteries (totaling 20 pieces), equipped, along with other types, with 152 mm howitzers. By 1 June 1944, there were 192 such pieces in corps artillery.

Reserve of the Main Command included howitzer regiments (48 pieces) and heavy howitzer brigades (32 pieces), sometimes organized into artillery divisions.

By the outbreak of German-Soviet War older 152 mm howitzers were being replaced by the newer M-10. However the M-10 production rate was slow, so by June 1941 the M1910/37 was still in service and was employed by the RKKA in the German-Soviet War. However, no details of its service are available.

Summary
The M1910/37 was a relatively minor upgrade of a World War I-era howitzer, which did not address the main flaws of the latter, namely:
 Limited towing speed due to unsprung wheels
 Limited elevation and very small traverse
A short barrel meant short range, less than that of its main adversaries, such as the German 15 cm sFH 18 (8.8 km vs 13.3 km). Low muzzle velocity and small traverse also made the gun helpless against enemy armor.

On the other side, the M1910/37 was rugged, reliable and relatively light.

Ammunition
When set to fragmentation action, the OF-530 produced fragments which covered an area 70 m wide and 30 m deep. When set to HE action, the exploding shell produced a crater about 3.5 m in diameter and about 1.2 m deep.

Notes

References
 Shunkov V. N. - The Weapons of the Red Army, Mn. Harvest, 1999 (Шунков В. Н. - Оружие Красной Армии. — Мн.: Харвест, 1999.) 
Shirokorad A. B. - Encyclopedia of the Soviet Artillery - Mn. Harvest, 2000 (Широкорад А. Б. Энциклопедия отечественной артиллерии. — Мн.: Харвест, 2000.)
Ivanov A. - Artillery of the USSR in Second World War - SPb Neva, 2003 (Иванов А. Артиллерия СССР во Второй Мировой войне. — СПб., Издательский дом Нева, 2003.)

World War II artillery of the Soviet Union
152 mm artillery
Military equipment introduced in the 1930s